Stephen's Gulch is a conservation area located in the municipality of Clarington, Ontario. The conservation area borders a large section of the Soper Creek, and contains 354 acres of deciduous forests as well as coniferous forests and swamps. The conservation area is also an important watershed area for Ontario.

History

Administration and management
The Stephen's Gulch conservation area is under the administration of the [Central Lake Ontario Conservation Authority|Central Lake Ontario Conservation Authority (CLOCA)] who are responsible for a variety of watershed services as well as upkeep of Stephen's Gulch.

Climate
Stephen's Gulch has a humid continental climate with long, cold winters and hot summers. During winters temperatures can drop below -10 °C and can exceed 20 °C during summers. Rainfall averages 1093 mm per year, with late summer/early fall being the wettest months and winter the driest.

Geology and soils
Stephen's Gulch is mostly underlain by the Precambrian-era metamorphic and igneous rock of the Canadian Shield. Soils in the conservation area are mostly fine and high-quality, and average high levels of infiltration.

Flora and Fauna
There are a wide variety of animals that live in Stephen's Gulch, including 46 species of birds and 13 species of mammals. Animals that inhabit Stephen's Gulch include White-tailed deer, Red Foxes, Black-capped chickadees, and Pileated woodpeckers.

Old growth balsam firs, black pines, and white ash are common in the conservation area.

References

Clarington
Conservation areas in Ontario